The Office de Formation et de Documentation Internationale (OFDI) organized law seminars in Paris, France, and Brussels, Belgium, in the 1980s.

References and notes 

International law organizations
Organizations based in Europe